Gonzalo Manuel García García (born 13 October 1983), sometimes known simply as Gonzalo García or Gonzalo, is a professional football manager and former player, who is the head coach of HNL club Istra 1961. Born in Uruguay, he moved to Spain at the age of 13.

Gonzalo joined Real Madrid as a teenager but never made it past the third team or played any higher than Segunda División B in Spain, spending most of his career in the Dutch Eredivisie as well as in Cyprus and Israel.

Early life
Born in Montevideo, Uruguay, Gonzalo moved to Spain at the age of 13, to his grandparents' native Galicia. He was nicknamed after Uruguay and Inter Milan player Álvaro Recoba, who played in the same position.

He would eventually represent the Spain national under-17 team, at the same time as Andrés Iniesta, José Antonio Reyes and Fernando Torres. His performances attracted suitors such as A.C. Milan – who sent Franco Baresi to his home in the village of Os Tilos, Teo – but his cash-strapped club SD Compostela had already accepted an offer of 50 million pesetas (€300,000) from Real Madrid, a record for the capital team's youth teams.

Playing career
Gonzalo could never move past Real Madrid's third team as a senior. In his country of adoption he never played in higher than the third division, also representing AD Alcorcón, Mérida UD and CF Palencia.

In 2005, Gonzalo moved to the Netherlands, first with AGOVV Apeldoorn, being one of the leading top scorers in the second level season under manager Stanley Menzo. He immediately switched to the Eredivisie after signing with SC Heerenveen, playing his first match in the competition on 10 February 2007 against Vitesse Arnhem but appearing rarely over the course of two seasons, finishing 2007–08 on loan to Heracles Almelo and helping the club narrowly avoid relegation.

Subsequently, Gonzalo signed with FC Groningen, penning a four-year deal with the Euroborg club. First-choice in his debut campaign – 28 matches, four goals – he was rarely played in 2009–10, being again loaned in the January transfer window, now to VVV-Venlo.

In June 2011, Gonzalo moved to Cyprus with AEK Larnaca FC. On the 14th, in the second qualifying round of the UEFA Europa League, he scored a hat-trick in an 8–0 away routing of Floriana FC.

In June 2012, Gonzalo signed with Israel's Maccabi Tel Aviv FC. He settled rarely in the following years, but did spend two seasons with Cypriot First Division club Anorthosis Famagusta FC, the first on loan.

Gonzalo returned to Dutch football on 4 August 2015, after agreeing to a contract at Heracles. He retired at the age of 34, following a spell with former youth club  Compostela.

Coaching career
García started working as a manager immediately after retiring, acting as assistant at Esbjerg fB of the Danish 1st Division. On 16 May 2019, after one year in the same capacity at FC Twente, he was appointed their head coach. His contract was not renewed after it expired following the 2019–20 season.

On 16 June 2021, García was appointed head coach of Croatian Prva HNL side NK Istra 1961.

Managerial statistics

Honours

Player
Maccabi Tel Aviv
Israeli Premier League: 2012–13

References

External links

Stats at Voetbal International 

1983 births
Living people
AD Alcorcón footballers
AEK Larnaca FC players
AGOVV Apeldoorn players
Anorthosis Famagusta F.C. players
Association football midfielders
CF Palencia footballers
Croatian Football League managers
Cypriot First Division players
Eerste Divisie players
Eredivisie managers
Eredivisie players
Expatriate football managers in Croatia
Expatriate football managers in the Netherlands
Expatriate footballers in Cyprus
Expatriate footballers in Israel
Expatriate footballers in the Netherlands
FC Groningen players
FC Twente managers
FC Twente non-playing staff
Footballers from Galicia (Spain)
Footballers from Montevideo
Heracles Almelo players
Israeli Premier League players
Maccabi Tel Aviv F.C. players
Mérida UD footballers
NK Istra 1961 managers
People from Santiago (comarca)
Real Madrid C footballers
SC Heerenveen players
SD Compostela footballers
Segunda División B players
Spain youth international footballers
Spanish expatriate football managers
Spanish expatriate footballers
Spanish expatriate sportspeople in Croatia
Spanish expatriate sportspeople in Cyprus
Spanish expatriate sportspeople in Israel
Spanish expatriate sportspeople in the Netherlands
Spanish football managers
Spanish footballers
Sportspeople from the Province of A Coruña
Tercera División players
Uruguayan expatriate footballers
Uruguayan expatriate sportspeople in Cyprus
Uruguayan expatriate sportspeople in Israel
Uruguayan expatriate sportspeople in the Netherlands
Uruguayan footballers
Uruguayan people of Galician descent
Uruguayan people of Spanish descent
VVV-Venlo players